Leo Salkeld Sowerby (1 May 1895 – 7 July 1968) was an American composer and church musician. He won the Pulitzer Prize for music in 1946 and was often called the “Dean of American church music” in the early to mid 20th century.

Biography
Leo Sowerby, son of Florence Gertrude Salkeld and John Sowerby, was born on 1 May 1895, in Grand Rapids, Michigan, where he began to compose at the age of 10. His interest in the organ began at the age of 15, and he was self-taught at the instrument. He studied composition with Arthur Olaf Andersen at the American Conservatory of Music in Chicago. Early recognition came when his Violin Concerto was premiered in 1913 by the Chicago Symphony Orchestra. He spent time in France during the First World War in the role of bandmaster. In 1921 he was awarded the Rome Prize (from the American Academy in Rome), the first composer to receive this. He began teaching at the American Conservatory of Music in 1924. He received the 1946 Pulitzer Prize for Music for his cantata, the Canticle of the Sun, written in 1944.

In 1919 Sowerby became associate organist at Fourth Presbyterian Church of Chicago, and in 1927 he became organist and choirmaster at St James's Episcopal Church in Chicago, which was consecrated as a cathedral in 1955 while he was there. 

In 1962, after his retirement from St James's, he was called to Washington National Cathedral to become the founding director of the College of Church Musicians, a position he held until his death in 1968. He died in Port Clinton, Ohio, while at Camp Wa-Li-Ro in Put-in-Bay, Ohio, the summer choir camp where he had taught for many years. He is buried in Washington National Cathedral.

His substantial output includes over 500 works in every genre but opera and ballet. His later works, composed while he was at St James's, Chicago, and Washington National Cathedral, are primarily church music for choir and organ. 

For Sowerby's notable pupils

Selected works

Choral
Cantatas
A Liturgy of Hope (selections from the Psalms) (1917)
The Vision of Sir Launfal poem of James Russell Lowell (1925)
Forsaken of Man (Passion setting, adapted from the Gospels by Edward Borgers) (1939)
The Canticle of the Sun (St Francis of Assisi) (1944)
Christ Reborn, for voices and organ (1950)
The Throne of God (Book of Revelation), for voices and orchestra (1956)
The Ark of the Covenant, for voices and organ (1961)
Anthems
"Ad te levavi animam meam"
"Be ye followers of God"
"Behold, O God our Defender"
"Christians, to the Paschal Victim"
"Come, Holy Ghost, our souls inspire"
"Eternal light"
"I was glad when they said unto me" (Psalm 122)
"I will lift up mine eyes" (Psalm 121)
"Love Came Down at Christmas"
"Now There Lightens Upon Us"
"Thy Word is a lantern" (in memory of President John F. Kennedy)
"Seeing We Also Are Compassed About" (Hebrews 12:1–2, commissioned by the Illinois Wesleyan University Collegiate Choir in the fall of 1957)

Solo voice with accompaniment
Originally published by H. W. Gray, reprinted by the Leo Sowerby Foundation, Bryn Mawr, Pa., Theodore Presser, sole selling agent, 1996.
The Edge of Dreams, song cycle, with piano (Mark Turbyfill), H. 154 (1920)
"The Adventurer"
"After-thought"
"Sorrow"
"Pulse of Spring"
"The Forest of Dead Trees"
"O Love that has Come at All"
"I Will Lift Up Mine Eyes", with organ (Psalm 121), H. 147
"O God of Light" (Matthew 5:13–16) (1934)
"O Jesus, Lord of Mercy" (1934)
" Perfect Love" (D. F. Gurney), H. 237 (1939)
"Thou Art My Strength", with organ (Psalm 30)
Three Psalms for bass and organ, H 189 (1949)
"Hear My Cry, O God" (Psalm 61)
"The Lord Is My Shepherd" (Psalm 23)
"How Long Wilt Thou Forget Me?"
Three Psalms for baritone or contralto and organ, H. 228
"Whoso Dwelleth" (Psalm 91)
"O Be Joyful in the Lord" (Psalm 100)
"I Will Lift Up Mine Eyes" (Psalm 121)

Organ solo
Comes Autumn Time (1916)
Carillon (1917)
Requiescat in Pace (1920)
Symphony in G (1930)
Pageant (1931)
Meditations on Communion Hymns (1942)
Prelude on "The King's Majesty" (1945)
Canon, Chacony, & Fugue (1948)
Ten Hymn Preludes (published separately; 1950s)
Sinfonia Brevis (1965)
Passacaglia (1967)

Organ with other instruments
Elevation, for violin and organ (1912)
Ballade, for English horn and organ (1949)
Festival Musick for organ, brass and timpani (1953)
Toccata on 'A.G.O.' (third movement of Festival Musick)
Fantasy, for trumpet and organ (1962)

Orchestra
Five symphonies
No. 1 (1921)
No. 2 (1927)
No. 3 (1939–40)
No. 4 (1944–47)
No. 5 (1964)
 Comes Autumn Time, "program overture" (organ version 1916; orchestrated 1917)
 From the Northland, suite for orchestra (1923)
 Synconata, symphonic poem for jazz orchestra (1924)
 Symphony for Jazz Orchestra (“Monotony”), suite for jazz orchestra (1925)
 Prairie, symphonic poem for orchestra (1929)
 A Set of Four: A Suite of Ironics, published in 1931

Orchestra with solo instruments
 Violin Concerto in G major (1913, revised 1924)
 Cello Concerto in A major (1914–16)
 Piano Concerto no. 1 (1916, revised 1919)
 Ballad of King Estmere, for two pianos and orchestra (1922)
 Medieval Poem, for organ and orchestra (1926)
 Cello Concerto [no. 2] in E minor (1929–34)
 Piano Concerto no. 2 (1932)
 Organ Concerto no. 1 (1937)
 Classic Concerto, for organ and string orchestra  (1944)
 Concerto in C, for organ and orchestra
 Harp Concerto
 Concert Piece, for organ and orchestra (1951)

Chamber music
 Three Violin Sonatas
 No. 1 in A major
 No. 2 in B-flat major (1922)
 No. 3 in D major
 Sonata for Cello and Piano (1920)
 Sonata for Viola and Piano (also playable on clarinet)
 Piano Trio in C-sharp minor
 Serenade for string quartet in G major composed in 1917 as a birthday gift to Elizabeth Sprague Coolidge, published 1921
 Trio for flute, viola, and pianoforte composed 1919
 Wind Quintet (1916, published in 1930 by H.T. FitzSimons)
 Piano Sonata in D Major (1948, rev. 1964)
 Passacaglia for piano
 Sonata for trumpet and piano (1958)
 Sonata for Clarinet and Piano (1944)

Discography
 "Impressions: Music for Piano" (Suites: "Florida" and "From the Northland" Folksong and Country Dance Tunes: "Three Folk-tunes from Somerset", "Money Musk", "Fisherman's Tune", "The Irish Washerwoman: A Country Dance Tune", "L'Amour Di Quei Due (The Two Lovers): A Milanese Popular Song")  – Malcolm Halliday, pianist : (Troy 226), Albany: Troy Records, 1997 Records
 My Love Unspoken (21 songs), (Troy 196), Albany: Troy Records, 1996 (with Robert Osborne, bass-baritone, and Malcolm Halliday, pianist; John Yaffé, producer).
 I Will Lift Up Mine Eyes – The Roberts Wesleyan College Chorale & Roberts Wesleyan Brass Ensemble, Robert Shewan, conductor – (Troy 238), Albany NY: Troy Records, 1997
 Leo Sowerby: American Master of Sacred Song – Gloriae Dei Cantores, Elizabeth Patterson, conductor; David Chalmers, James E. Jordan, jr., organists – Orleans MA: Paraclete Press, (GDCD 016), 1994
 Organ Music of Leo Sowerby (Symphony in G, Requiescat in pace, Fantasy for Flute Stops) – Catharine Crozier, organ – Chatsworth CA: Delos International, (D/CD 3075), 1988
 Leo Sowerby:  Works for Organ and Orchestra (Classic Concerto, Medieval Poem, Pageant, Festival Music) – David Craighead, David Mulbury, organ; The Fairfield Orchestra, John Welsh, conductor – NAXOS 8.559028
 Violin & Organ, The Murray/Lohuis Duo (Poem) – Robert Murray, Violin, Ardyth Lohuis, organ – Richmond, VA: Raven Recordings, (OAR 200), 1991
 Rondo, Works for Violin & Organ, Vo. 2 (Ballade) – Robert Murray, Violin, Ardyth Lohuis, organ – Richmond, VA: Raven Recordings, (OAR 230), 1993
 Leo Sowerby: Music for Violin and Piano (Sonata in B-Flat, H165; Sonata in D, H 367; Two American Pieces, H 174) – Robert Murray, Violin; Gail Quillman, Piano – New York, NY: Premier Recordings, Inc., (PRCD 1049), 1995
 All American, Works for Violin and Organ, Volume 5 (Elevation, H 66) – Robert Murray, Violin, Ardyth Lohuis, organ – Richmond, VA: Raven Recordings, (OAR 650), 2003
 Leo Sowerby: The Paul Whiteman Commissions & Other Early Works (Synconata, H 176a, Symphony for Jazz Orchestra, H 178) – Andy Baker Orchestra, Avalon String Quartet, Winston Choi, Piano – Chicago, IL: Cedille Records, (CDR 90000 205), 2021
 Trios from the City of Big Shoulders, Lincoln Trio, Cedille CDR90000203 (2021), includes Trio for violin, violoncello and pianoforte, H. 312 (1953)

References

Further reading
Amacker, Marianne. 1970. "The Chorale Preludes of Leo Sowerby". The Diapason 61, no. 9 (August): 20–21.
Sharp, Timothy W. 1995. "The Choral Music of Leo Sowerby: A Centennial Perspective". The Choral Journal. 35, no. 8 (March): 9–19.

External links
Art of the States: Leo Sowerby
Buzard, Stephen. 2017. On Big Shoulders: Learning Sowerby at St. James Cathedral, Chicago. Vox Humana (October 22, 2017).
Stover, Harold. 1995. "Sowerby at 100". The New England Organist (May–June).

Leo Sowerby Papers at the Newberry

1895 births
1968 deaths
20th-century American composers
20th-century classical composers
20th-century American male musicians
American classical composers
American Conservatory of Music alumni
American male classical composers
Burials at Washington National Cathedral
Classical musicians from Illinois
Classical musicians from Michigan
Composers for carillon
Musicians from Chicago
Musicians from Grand Rapids, Michigan
Pulitzer Prize for Music winners
Cedille Records artists
American Conservatory of Music faculty